Six ships of the Royal Navy have borne the name HMS Cossack, after the Cossack people of Eastern Europe, whilst another was begun but was cancelled while building:

  was a 22-gun sixth-rate post-ship, begun under the name Pandour in 1805, but renamed before being launched in 1806.  She was broken up in 1816.
 HMS Cossack was to have been a steam gunvessel, laid down at Portsmouth Dockyard in 1846, but cancelled in May 1849.
  was ordered as the Russian ship Witjas, a wood screw corvette building on the Thames at Northfleet, but the British government seized her while she was under construction in 1854; she was sold in 1875.
  was an  launched in 1886 and sold in 1905.
  was a  destroyer launched in 1907 and sold in 1919.
  was a  destroyer launched in 1944 and broken up in 1961.

See also 
 

Royal Navy ship names